The 2018 Canada Sevens was the third edition of the Canada Sevens tournament, and the sixth tournament of the 2017–18 World Rugby Sevens Series. The tournament was played on 10–11 March at BC Place in Vancouver.

Format
The teams were drawn into four pools of four teams each, with each team playing every other team in their pool once. The top two teams from each pool advanced to the Cup/5th place brackets. The bottom two teams from each group went to the Challenge trophy/13th place brackets.

Teams
Fifteen core teams participated in the tournament along with one invited team, the highest-placing non-core team of the 2018 Sudamérica Rugby Sevens, Uruguay:

Pool stage
All times in Pacific Standard Time (UTC−08:00). The pools were scheduled as follows:

Pool A

Pool B

Pool C

Pool D

Knockout stage

13th Place

Challenge Trophy

5th Place

Cup

Tournament placings

Source: World Rugby

Players

Scoring leaders

Source: World Rugby

Dream Team
The following seven players were selected to the tournament Dream Team at the conclusion of the tournament:

References

External links
Tournament Page

Canada Sevens
Canada
Canada Sevens
Canada Sevens
Canada Sevens